Gesupur is a village and panchayat in Bulandshahr district, Meerut division, Uttar Pradesh, India, on the Kali River. It was named in honour of Mir Gesu, a 16th-century Faujdar of Mirtha and Delhi. Most of the village's inhabitants are from the Chattha clan of the Jat people.

In 1999 the village united in a boycott of the Lok Sabha elections, when none of the 7,200 registered electors voted in protest against the lack of investment in the local infrastructure. The boycott was a success, leading to improvements being made in roads and the supply of electricity and water.

References

Villages in Bulandshahr district